Events from the year 1870 in Sweden

Incumbents
 Monarch – Charles XV

Events
 - In accordance with the recommendations of the progressive Girls' School Committee of 1866, the first gymnasium for women is opened (at Wallinska skolan in Stockholm).
 - Universities open to women (at the same terms as men 1873).
 - The first Folk high school open to women is founded by Fredrique Paijkull.
 - The Bukowskis is founded
 - First issue of Sydsvenskan

Births

 25 January - Helge von Koch, mathematician  (died 1924) 
 27 May - Anna Stecksén, pathologist (died 1904) 
 3 April - Agda Östlund, suffragist and social democrat  (died 1942) 
 7 April – Anna Lindhagen, politician and social reformer (died 1941)
 2 October - Hilma Swedahl, gold prospector (died 1965)
 11 November - Sigfrid Edström, 4th president of the IOC (died 1964)

Deaths

 28 June – Henrik Reuterdahl,  archbishop (born 1795)

References

External links

 
Years of the 19th century in Sweden
Sweden